Romania competed at the 2012 Summer Paralympics in London, United Kingdom from August 29 to September 9, 2012.

Medalists

Athletics 

Men's Field Events
Romania sent for the first time an athlete in Athletics competition.

Cycling

Road

Men

Track

Time Trial

Individual Pursuit

Swimming

Women

Table tennis 

Men

See also

 Romania at the 2012 Summer Olympics

References

Nations at the 2012 Summer Paralympics
2012
2012 in Romanian sport